Colin Taylforth (born 16 September 1953 in Liverpool) is a former pair skater who represented Great Britain.  With partner Linda Connolly, he finished 14th at the 1972 Winter Olympics.  He later married Erika Susman and began an on-ice partnership with his new wife.  They finished 11th at the 1976 Winter Olympics.

Taylforth and Susman later divorced.

References
 Sports-Reference profile

British male pair skaters
Figure skaters at the 1972 Winter Olympics
Figure skaters at the 1976 Winter Olympics
Olympic figure skaters of Great Britain
Sportspeople from Liverpool
1953 births
Living people